Daniel Kolocho Bameyi (born 4 January 2006) is a Nigerian international footballer who plays as a centre-back.

Club career
Bameyi is listed as playing for an Abuja-based club named Yum Yum FC, although it has been reported that no club by this name exists in Nigeria.

International career

Youth
Bameyi represented Nigeria's under-20 team at the 2023 U-20 Africa Cup of Nations, captaining the side as they finished third in the competition. His performances at the tournament were not particularly impressive; having been suspended for the quarter-finals after accumulating two yellow cards in the group stage, his mistake in the semi-final allowed the Gambia to score the only goal of the game.

Senior
Bameyi was first called up to the senior team of Nigeria in November 2022, for a friendly game against Costa Rica, going on to make his debut in the 2–0 loss. He was again called up to the senior squad for two 2023 Africa Cup of Nations qualification games against Guinea-Bissau.

Career statistics

International

References

2006 births
Living people
Nigerian footballers
Nigeria youth international footballers
Nigeria international footballers
Association football central defenders